Holbeach St Marks is a fenland village in the South Holland district of southern Lincolnshire, England.

The village church is dedicated to St Mark, and was built to the designs of Ewan Christian in 1868–69. In 1964 Pevsner mentioned that it was almost a copy of Christian's Christ Church church at Gedney Dawsmere 4 miles to the east. It is constructed of red brick with stone bands, a brick-faced interior, lancet windows, and a combined nave and apse. The slate roof holds a bellcote.

T. H. White was once a resident at the village's New Inn public house.

The village school is the Holbeach St Mark's Church of England Primary School for mixed gender 4 to 11 year olds, providing for pupils in the village and surrounding area.

Holbeach St Marks was home to the Tinsley Food plant, a major county employer supplying Safeway and Marks and Spencer. In 2001 it closed its factory with the loss of 850 jobs.

The old Tinsley site is now home to Bakkavor employing several hundred people from the surrounding area.

The land surrounding is fertile silt making it excellent for food production

References

External links

 Holbeach, Genuki. Retrieved 27 October 2011
Crowhurst, Richard; A Short History of Holbeach St Marks. Retrieved 27 October 2011

Villages in Lincolnshire
Holbeach